Leo Goldstein was an American-Israeli association football referee who survived the Holocaust thanks to his expertise in the rules of soccer.

Biography
Leo Goldstein was a Polish-born Jew. He was deported to Auschwitz and was condemned to the gas chambers but was suddenly pulled aside by an SS guard who claimed to be a German international soccer player. He was ordered to return to the barracks and serve as a referee in soccer games between soldiers and guards at Auschwitz and nearby camps.

After the war he immigrated to Israel, but eventually settled in New York, where he worked as a taxi driver and a referee of soccer games in the Bowery.

Sports career
Goldstein refereed for the American Soccer League in the 1950s and 1960s, before becoming a FIFA international referee between 1959 and 1967. Goldstein was active as an assistant referee at FIFA World Cups, officiating the Hungary-England and Chile-Italy matches in the group stages in 1962. He also officiated in the 1959 Pan American Games and 1962 World Cup qualifiers.

Goldstein is a member of the National Soccer Hall of Fame and Museum.

See also
List of Jews in sports (non-players)

References

Year of birth missing
Year of death missing
FIFA World Cup referees
American soccer referees
American Jews
Israeli football referees
American taxi drivers
Israeli taxi drivers